Yarden Malka Ozel (born February 11, 2001) is an Israelian professional football player who plays as a striker for Cypriot club Lakatamia FC.

Professional football player career 
Scouted at the age of 10 years old by the prestigious Israelian club Hapoel Jerusalem FC, she joined the Hapoel Jerusalem FC Academy in 2011.

Youth career

 2011-2015: Hapoel Jerusalem FC (Jerusalem, Israel)

Professional career
She began her professional career as a professional footballer in 2015 with her Academy Club.

 2015-2017: Hapoel Jerusalem FC (Jerusalem, Israel) 40 goals / 14 assists 
 2017-2020: Wingate Institute (Netanya, Israel) / Hapoel Jerusalem FC (Jerusalem, Israel)  34 goals / 8 assists 
 2020-2021: ASA Tel Aviv University (Tel Aviv, Israel) 5 goals / 6 assists 
 2021-2022: F.C. Kiryat Gat (women) (Kiryat Gat, Israel) 5 goals / 6 assists 
 2022-: Lakatamia FC (Lakatámia, Cyprus) 13 goals / 5 assists

Honors 
 2016-2017: Champion of Israel
 2018-2019: Cup of Israel
 2019-2020: Best goal of the year
 2022: Best scorer of winter

References 

2001 births
Living people
Ligat Nashim players
Israeli women's footballers
Women's association football forwards